Mimi Weyforth Dawson (born August 31, 1944) is an American political aide who served as a Commissioner of the Federal Communications Commission from 1981 to 1987 and as the United States Deputy Secretary of Transportation from 1987 to 1989.

References

1944 births
Living people
Members of the Federal Communications Commission
United States Deputy Secretaries of Transportation
Missouri Republicans
Reagan administration personnel